The law enforcement agencies of Madagascar include:
The Gendarmerie Nationale (Malagasy: Zandarimariam-pirenena), the national police force of Madagascar, with 8,100 staff (in 2006) operating under the Ministry of Defense.
The Gendarmerie is supplemented by a Presidential Security Regiment.
A 3,000-member Civil Police force under the Ministry of Interior, with a role in policing the cities. 
A General Directorate of Information and Documentation Internal and External (Direction Générale de l'Information et de la Documentation, Intérieure et Exterieure—DGIDIE), a secret political police, was established under the Presidency of Didier Ratsiraka.

See also
Gendarmerie
List of gendarmeries

References

Sources
 World Police Encyclopedia, ed. by Dilip K. Das & Michael Palmiotto published by Taylor & Francis. 2004, 
 World Encyclopedia of Police Forces and Correctional Systems,second edition, Gale., 2006
 Sullivan, Larry E. Encyclopedia of Law Enforcement. Thousand Oaks: Sage Publications, 2005.

 
Government of Madagascar